People with the surname Attewell:

Bill Attewell, Canadian politician
David Attewell, English basketball player
Humphrey Attewell, British Trade unionist
Len Attewell, Welsh international rugby union player
Thomas Attewell, English cricketer
Walter Attewell, English cricketer
William Attewell, English cricketer